The Emotion Machine: Commonsense Thinking, Artificial Intelligence, and the Future of the Human Mind is a 2006 book by cognitive scientist Marvin Minsky that elaborates and expands on Minsky's ideas as presented in his earlier book Society of Mind.

Minsky argues that emotions are different ways to think that our mind uses to increase our intelligence. He challenges the distinction between emotions and other kinds of thinking. His main argument is that emotions are "ways to think" for different "problem types" that exist in the world, and that the brain has rule-based mechanisms (selectors) that turn on emotions to deal with various problems. The book reviews the accomplishments of AI, why modelling an AI is difficult in terms of replicating the behaviors of humans, if and how AIs think, and in what manner they might experience struggles and pleasures.

Reviews
In a review for The Washington Post, neurologist Richard Restak states that:

Outline
Minsky outlines the book as follows:

 "We are born with many mental resources."
 "We learn from interacting with others."
  "Emotions are different Ways to Think."
  "We learn to think about our recent thoughts."
  "We learn to think on multiple levels."
  "We accumulate huge stores of commonsense knowledge."
  "We switch among different Ways to Think."
  "We find multiple ways to represent things."
 "We build multiple models of ourselves."

Other reviews
 Science and Evolution - Books and Reviews
 Technology Review

Author's pre-publication draft
 Introduction
 Chapter 1. Falling in Love
 Chapter 2. ATTACHMENTS AND GOALS
 Chapter 3. FROM PAIN TO SUFFERING
 Chapter 4. CONSCIOUSNESS 
 Chapter 5. LEVELS OF MENTAL ACTIVITIES
 Chapter 6. COMMON SENSE
 Chapter 7. Thinking.
 Chapter 8. Resourcefulness.
 Chapter 9. The Self.
 BIBLIOGRAPHY

References

External links 
Marvin Minsky at MIT

2006 non-fiction books
Books about cognition
Artificial neural networks
Artificial intelligence publications